Owen Lovejoy (1811–1864) was an American lawyer.

Owen Lovejoy may also refer to:

Owen Lovejoy (anthropologist) (born 1943), American anthropologist
Owen Reed Lovejoy (1866–1961), American opponent of child labor